Claude David Larose (born March 2, 1942) is a Canadian former professional ice hockey player who played 943 career NHL games for the Montreal Canadiens, Minnesota North Stars and St. Louis Blues. He also served as an assistant coach for the Hartford Whalers after his retirement. He won 6 Stanley Cups during his career 1965, 1966, 1968, 1971, 1973 (as a player with Montreal), 2006 (as a Scout) with Carolina.

Early life 
Larose was born in Hearst, Ontario. He played junior hockey with the Peterborough Petes.

Career 
Over a 16-year career, 10 with the Canadiens, Larose scored 226 goals and added 257 assists for 483 points in 943 NHL games. He also had 887 career penalty minutes and led the Canadiens in penalties during the 1971 Stanley Cup Playoffs, when Montreal upset both the defending champion Boston Bruins and the Chicago Black Hawks.

Playing on a line with Minnesota North Stars teammates Grant and Danny O'Shea, Larose scored the tying, final goal in the 1969 NHL All-Star Game.

Returning from an injury in 1974, Larose was thrown onto a line with the Mahovlich brothers, Frank and Peter, and scored four goals against Pittsburgh's Gary Inness. He got a hat trick the next game while playing the right wing with Jacques Lemaire and Steve Shutt. Paired with them again, he got two goals the following game.

Since retiring from professional hockey, Larose worked as a scout for the Carolina Hurricanes.

Personal life 
Larose is the father of NHL player Guy Larose.

Career statistics

See also
Stanley Cup
List of Stanley Cup champions

References

External links

 Profile at hockey-reference.com

1942 births
Living people
Canadian ice hockey coaches
Canadian ice hockey right wingers
Carolina Hurricanes scouts
Franco-Ontarian people
Hartford Whalers coaches
Houston Apollos players
Hull-Ottawa Canadiens players
Ice hockey people from Ontario
Minnesota North Stars players
Montreal Canadiens players
Omaha Knights (CHL) players
People from Hearst, Ontario
Peterborough Petes (ice hockey) players
St. Louis Blues players
Stanley Cup champions